Alex de Oliveira (born February 21, 1988) is a Brazilian professional mixed martial artist who competed in the Welterweight division of the Ultimate Fighting Championship (UFC).

Background
Born and raised in Três Rios, Rio de Janeiro, Oliveira worked for a time as a construction worker and bull rider before he starting training in martial arts. Oliveira had three brothers – of whom two deceased due to violent crime – and four sisters. He also trained in Muay Thai for a couple of years before switching to mixed martial arts at the age of 22.

Mixed martial arts career
Fighting out of Três Rios, he made his professional debut competing in the welterweight division in December 2011.  He compiled a record of 11–2–1 (1), including a two-fight stint for Bitetti Combat while competing exclusively for regional promotions in his native Brazil.  After taking a unanimous decision victory over Joilton Santos, Oliveira signed with the UFC in early 2015.

Ultimate Fighting Championship

2015
Oliveira made his promotional debut as a short notice replacement against Gilbert Burns on March 21, 2015, at UFC Fight Night 62, filling in for an injured Josh Thomson. After arguably winning each of the first two rounds, Oliveira eventually lost via submission in the third round.

For his second fight in the UFC, Oliveira was again tabbed as  short notice replacement and faced K.J. Noons on May 30, 2015, at UFC Fight Night 67, filling in for Yan Cabral. Oliveira won the fight via submission in the first round.

Competing in his third UFC fight in just over three months, Oliveira faced promotional newcomer Joe Merritt on June 27, 2015, at UFC Fight Night 70. Oliveira won the fight by unanimous decision.

Oliveira faced Piotr Hallmann in a lightweight bout on November 7, 2015, at UFC Fight Night 77. He won the fight by knockout in the third round. The win also earned Oliveira his first Performance of the Night bonus award.

2016
Oliveira fought Donald Cerrone on February 21, 2016, at UFC Fight Night 83, filling in for Tim Means. Oliveira lost the fight via submission in the first round.

Oliveira faced James Moontasri on July 23, 2016, at UFC on Fox 20. He won the one-sided fight via unanimous decision.

Oliveira next faced Will Brooks in a lightweight bout on October 1, 2016, at UFC Fight Night 96. The bout took place at a catchweight of 161.5 lbs, as Oliveira missed weight. Oliveira won the fight via KO in the third round.

Oliveira faced Tim Means on December 30, 2016, at UFC 207. The bout was halted in the first round after Means landed several knees to the head of Oliveira while he was considered a grounded opponent. As a result, Oliveira was unable to continue after the foul occurred. Subsequently, referee Dan Miragliotta judged that the foul was accidental, and in turn, the result was scored a No Contest.

2017
A rematch with Means eventually took place on March 11, 2017, at UFC Fight Night 106. Oliveira won the bout via submission in the second round.

Oliveira faced Ryan LaFlare on July 22, 2017, at UFC on Fox 25. He won the fight via knockout in the second round, after landing a well timed right uppercut. He was awarded his second Performance of the Night bonus award.

Oliveira faced Yancy Medeiros on December 2, 2017, at UFC 218. He lost the back-and-forth fight via TKO in the third round. Despite the loss, Oliveira earned his first Fight of the Night bonus award for the fight.

2018
Oliveira defeated Carlos Condit  on April 14, 2018, at UFC on Fox 29, after replacing injured Matt Brown. He won the fight via a guillotine choke. This fight earned him the Performance of the Night bonus award.

Oliveira was expected to face Neil Magny on September 22, 2018, at UFC Fight Night 137. However Magny was removed from the pairing on August 22 in favor of a matchup with Santiago Ponzinibbio in November at UFC Fight Night 140,  he was replaced by Carlo Pedersoli Jr. Oliveira won the fight via knockout just 39 seconds into the first round.

Oliveira faced Gunnar Nelson on December 8, 2018, at UFC 231. He lost the fight via a rear-naked choke in round two.

2019
Oliveira was expected to face Li Jingliang on April 27, 2019, at UFC Fight Night: Jacaré vs. Hermansson. However, it was reported on March 23, 2019, that Li was injured and was forced to pull from the bout. He was replaced by Mike Perry. Oliveira lost the back-and-forth fight by unanimous decision. The bout also earned Oliveira his second Fight of the Night bonus award.

Oliveira faced returning veteran Nicolas Dalby on September 28, 2019, at UFC Fight Night 160. He lost the fight via unanimous decision. Subsequently the decision was appealed on grounds of erroneous action by the referee.

2020
Oliveira was expected to face Mickey Gall on February 29, 2020, at UFC Fight Night 169. However, on December 27, 2019, the bout was pulled from the event by the UFC. Oliveira was quickly rescheduled and instead faced Max Griffin the following week at UFC 248. He won the back-and-forth fight via split decision.

Oliveira faced Peter Sobotta on July 26, 2020, at UFC Fight Night: Whittaker vs. Till. He won the fight via unanimous decision.

Oliveira faced Shavkat Rakhmonov, replacing injured Elizeu Zaleski dos Santos on October 24, 2020, at UFC 254. At the weigh-ins, Oliveira weighed in at 173 pounds, two pounds over the welterweight non-title fight limit. The bout proceeded at catchweight and he was 20% his purse, which went to his opponent Rakhmonov. Oliveira lost the fight via a guillotine choke submission in the first round.

2021
Oliveira was expected to face Randy Brown on February 27, 2021, at UFC Fight Night 186. However, Brown pulled out of the fight during the week leading up to the event due to undisclosed reasons, and he was replaced by promotional newcomer Ramazan Kuramagomedov.  However, the bout was scrapped the day before the event when Kuramagomedov was removed due to illness. The bout between Oliveira and Brown was rescheduled and eventually took place at UFC 261 on April 24, 2021. Oliveira lost the fight via a one-armed rear naked choke in the first round.

Oliveira faced Niko Price on October 2, 2021, at UFC Fight Night 193. He lost the fight via unanimous decision.

2022
Oliveira faced Kevin Holland at UFC 272 on March 5, 2022. He lost the fight via technical knockout in round two.

In April 2022, it was announced that Oliveira was a free agent when his UFC contract and the UFC opted to not re-sign him.

Oliveira made his first appearance post-UFC against Michel Silva at BF Mr. Cage Fight Music Show on June 10, 2022. He lost the bout after getting choked unconscious in the second round via anaconda choke.

After picking up a quick victory on the Brazilian scene, Oliveira faced Aslambek Arsamikov on December 28. 2022 at Serbian Battle Championship 45, winning the bout via ground and pound TKO stoppage at the end of the first round.

Personal life
Oliveira is nicknamed "Cowboy" due to formerly being a rodeo bullrider.

Oliveira has ten children from various relationships.

Grenade attack on Christmas Eve 2018 

On Christmas Eve in 2018, while getting gasoline for his mother’s car in Tres Rios, Brazil, a grenade was thrown toward his direction after he noticed several family members in an altercation with heavily armed thugs. Oliveira subsequently underwent surgery to remove fragments of the grenade from his leg.

Incidents in May 2019
According to reports, seemingly intoxicated Oliveira got into an altercation with a security guard during a party on May 24, 2019. The next morning, Oliveira showed up at his wife's apartment where he allegedly assaulted her, fleeing the scene on a motorcycle with their baby daughter. The child was found on May 26 at one of Oliveira's sister's apartments, and Oliveira had generally been understood to be reported missing until his early March 2020 arrival in Las Vegas for the UFC 248 fight card which he competed on. In an interview Oliveira denied punching his wife but did not comment on other indictments. Oliveira also said they were only having an argument and that they haven't separated: on the contrary, his wife is pregnant again.

Championships and accomplishments
 Ultimate Fighting Championship
 Performance of the Night (Three times) vs Piotr Hallmann, Ryan LaFlare and Carlos Condit
 Fight of the Night (Two times) vs Yancy Medeiros, Mike Perry
 ESPN
 2017 Fight of the Year vs. Yancy Medeiros

Mixed martial arts record

|-
|Win
|align=center|24–13–1 (2)
|Aslambek Arsamikov
|TKO (punches)
|Serbian Battle Championship 45
|
|align=center|1
|align=center|4:35
|Subotica, Serbia
|
|-
|Win
|align=center| (2)
|Helison Cruz
|TKO (doctor stoppage)
|SFFN 9
|
|align=center|1
|align=center|0:36
|Três Rios, Brazil
|
|-
|Loss
|align=center| (2)
|Michel Silva
|Technical Submission (anaconda choke)
|BF Mr. Cage Fight Music Show
|
|align=center|2
|align=center|1:51
|Manaus, Brazil
|
|-
|Loss
|align=center| (2)
|Kevin Holland
|TKO (elbows)
|UFC 272
|
|align=center|2
|align=center|0:38
|Las Vegas, Nevada, United States
|
|-
|Loss
|align=center| (2)
|Niko Price
|Decision (unanimous)
|UFC Fight Night: Santos vs. Walker
|
|align=center|3
|align=center|5:00
|Las Vegas, Nevada, United States
|
|-
|Loss
|align=center| (2)
|Randy Brown
|Submission (rear-naked choke)
|UFC 261
|
|align=center|1
|align=center|2:50
|Jacksonville, Florida, United States
|
|-
|Loss
|align=center|22–9–1 (2)
|Shavkat Rakhmonov
|Submission (guillotine choke)
|UFC 254
|
|align=center|1
|align=center|4:40
|Abu Dhabi, United Arab Emirates
|
|-
|Win
|align=center|22–8–1 (2)
|Peter Sobotta
|Decision (unanimous)
|UFC on ESPN: Whittaker vs. Till
|
|align=center|3
|align=center|5:00
|Abu Dhabi, United Arab Emirates
|
|-
|Win
|align=center|21–8–1 (2)
|Max Griffin
|Decision (split)
|UFC 248
|
|align=center|3
|align=center|5:00
|Las Vegas, Nevada, United States
|
|-
|Loss
|align=center|20–8–1 (2)
|Nicolas Dalby
|Decision (unanimous)
|UFC Fight Night: Hermansson vs. Cannonier
|
|align=center|3
|align=center|5:00
|Copenhagen, Denmark
|
|-
|Loss
|align=center|20–7–1 (2)
|Mike Perry
|Decision (unanimous)
|UFC Fight Night: Jacaré vs. Hermansson
|
|align=center|3
|align=center|5:00
|Sunrise, Florida, United States
|
|-
|Loss
|align=center|20–6–1 (2)
|Gunnar Nelson
|Submission (rear-naked choke)
|UFC 231
|
|align=center|2
|align=center|4:17
|Toronto, Ontario, Canada
|
|-
|Win
|align=center|20–5–1 (2)
|Carlo Pedersoli Jr.
|TKO (punches)
|UFC Fight Night: Santos vs. Anders
|
|align=center|1
|align=center|0:39
|São Paulo, Brazil
|
|-
|Win
|align=center|19–5–1 (2)
|Carlos Condit
|Submission (guillotine choke)
|UFC on Fox: Poirier vs. Gaethje
|
|align=center|2
|align=center|3:17
|Glendale, Arizona, United States
|
|-
|Loss
|align=center|18–5–1 (2)
|Yancy Medeiros
|TKO (punches)
|UFC 218
|
|align=center|3
|align=center|2:02
|Detroit, Michigan, United States
|
|-
|Win
|align=center|18–4–1 (2)
|Ryan LaFlare
|KO (punch)
|UFC on Fox: Weidman vs. Gastelum 
|
|align=center|2
|align=center|1:50
|Uniondale, New York, United States
|
|-
|Win
|align=center|17–4–1 (2)
|Tim Means
|Submission (rear-naked choke) 
|UFC Fight Night: Belfort vs. Gastelum
|
|align=center|2
|align=center|2:38
|Fortaleza, Brazil
|
|-
|NC
|align=center|16–4–1 (2)
|Tim Means
|NC (illegal knees)
|UFC 207
|
|align=center|1
|align=center|3:33
|Las Vegas, Nevada, United States
|
|-
|Win
|align=center|16–4–1 (1)
|Will Brooks
|KO (punches)
|UFC Fight Night: Lineker vs. Dodson
|
|align=center|3
|align=center|3:30
|Portland, Oregon, United States
|  
|-
|Win
|align=center|15–4–1 (1)
|James Moontasri
|Decision (unanimous)
|UFC on Fox: Holm vs. Shevchenko
|
|align=center|3
|align=center|5:00
|Chicago, Illinois, United States
|
|-
|Loss
|align=center|14–4–1 (1)
|Donald Cerrone
|Submission (triangle choke)
|UFC Fight Night: Cowboy vs. Cowboy
|
|align=center|1
|align=center|2:33
|Pittsburgh, Pennsylvania, United States
|
|-
|Win
|align=center|14–3–1 (1)
|Piotr Hallmann
|KO (punch)
|UFC Fight Night: Belfort vs. Henderson 3
|
|align=center|3
|align=center|0:51
|São Paulo, Brazil
| 
|-
|Win
|align=center| 13–3–1 (1)
|Joe Merritt
|Decision (unanimous)
|UFC Fight Night: Machida vs. Romero
|
|align=center|3
|align=center|5:00
|Hollywood, Florida, United States
|
|-
|Win
|align=center| 12–3–1 (1)
|K. J. Noons
|Submission (rear-naked choke)
|UFC Fight Night: Condit vs. Alves
|
|align=center|1
|align=center|2:51
|Goiânia, Brazil
|
|-
|Loss
|align=center| 11–3–1 (1)
|Gilbert Burns
|Submission (armbar)
|UFC Fight Night: Maia vs. LaFlare
|
|align=center|3
|align=center|4:14
|Rio de Janeiro, Brazil
|
|-
|Win
|align=center| 11–2–1 (1)
|Joilton Santos
|Decision (unanimous) 
|Face to Face 10
|
|align=center|3
|align=center|5:00
|Itaboraí, Brazil
|
|-
|Win
|align=center| 10–2–1 (1)
|Douglas Aparecido
|TKO (punches)
|Watch Out Combat Show 38
|
|align=center|1
|align=center|2:52
|Ubá, Brazil
|
|-
|Win
|align=center| 9–2–1 (1)
|Ederson Moreira
|Submission (rear-naked choke)
|Watch Out Combat Show 36
|
|align=center|1
|align=center|4:18
|Três Rios, Brazil
|
|-
|NC
|align=center| 8–2–1 (1)
|Rogerio Matias
|NC (overturned)
|CEF 10
|
|align=center|1
|align=center|5:00
|Maceió, Brazil
|
|-
|Win
|align=center| 8–2–1
|Fabio Lima Ferreira
|TKO (punches)
|Bitetti Combat 19
|
|align=center|1
|align=center|4:26
|Manaus, Brazil
|
|-
|Win
|align=center| 7–2–1
|Welton Doidao
|Submission (rear-naked choke)
|Watch Out Combat Show 32
|
|align=center|3
|align=center|3:44
|Rio de Janeiro, Brazil
|
|-
|Win
|align=center| 6–2–1
|Thiago Macedo
|TKO (punches)
|Watch Out Combat Show 27
|
|align=center|1
|align=center|2:40
|Rio de Janeiro, Brazil
|
|-
|Draw
|align=center| 5–2–1
|Kenedy Gualande Andrade
|Draw (unanimous)
|Luta Contra o Crack
|
|align=center|3
|align=center|5:00
|Rio de Janeiro, Brazil
|
|-
|Win
|align=center| 5–2
|Jone Guilherme Garcia
|TKO (punches)
|Bitetti Combat 15
|
|align=center| 2
|align=center| 2:03
|Rio de Janeiro, Brazil
|
|-
|Loss
|align=center| 4–2
|Wendell Oliveira
|Decision (unanimous)
|Watch Out Combat Show 25
|
|align=center|3
|align=center|5:00
|Rio de Janeiro, Brazil
|
|-
|Win
|align=center| 4–1
|Daniel Silva
|TKO (doctor stoppage)
|JF Fight Evolution
|
|align=center|1
|align=center|5:00
|Juiz de Fora, Brazil
|
|-
|Win
|align=center| 3–1
|Fabi Ohany
|TKO (punches)
|Vicosa Fight 2
|
|align=center|1
|align=center|1:43
|Viçosa, Brazil
|
|-
|Win
|align=center| 2–1
|Leandro Beinrothi
|TKO (knees)
|Big Fights Champions
|
|align=center|1
|align=center|0:57
|Nova Serrana, Brazil
|
|-
|Loss
|align=center| 1–1
|Wallace Dantas
|Submission (triangle choke)
|ATS Kombat 1
|
|align=center|1
|align=center|1:03
|Senador Firmino, Brazil
|
|-
|Win
|align=center| 1–0
|Rodrigo Rodrigo
|KO (punches)
|Ervalia Fight
|
|align=center|1
|align=center|N/A
|Ervália, Brazil
|
|-

See also
 List of male mixed martial artists

References

External links

Brazilian male mixed martial artists
Welterweight mixed martial artists
Lightweight mixed martial artists
Mixed martial artists utilizing Muay Thai
Mixed martial artists utilizing Brazilian jiu-jitsu
Living people
1989 births
Sportspeople from Rio de Janeiro (state)
Ultimate Fighting Championship male fighters
Brazilian Muay Thai practitioners
Brazilian practitioners of Brazilian jiu-jitsu
People from Três Rios